Jerry Ray Fry (born February 29, 1956) is a former Major League Baseball player. Fry played in four games for the Montreal Expos in the 1978 season. He had no hits in nine at-bats, with one walk. He was drafted by the Expos in the second round of the 1974 amateur draft.

References

External links

1956 births
Living people
American expatriate baseball players in Canada
Baseball players from California
Denver Bears players
Gulf Coast Expos players
Major League Baseball catchers
Memphis Chicks players
Montreal Expos players
Quebec Metros players
Sportspeople from Salinas, California
West Palm Beach Expos players